Tomer Eiges (1995/1996 – 16 May 2021) was an Israeli IDF officer who served in the Military Intelligence Directorate, and died while in military prison awaiting trial for security offenses. He is said to have seriously harmed Israeli national security
 while acting independently from a personal motive. 

The IDF chief of staff said Eiges should not have died in prison. His family have demanded review of his death, and have said the army tried to "erase" him.

References

External links
 Eiges' LinkedIn profile
 Avner Barnea, Analysis: The mysterious case of IDF ‘Officer X’ who died in an Israeli prison, IntelNews, June 18, 2021

Israeli officers
People of the Military Intelligence Directorate (Israel)
Israeli people who died in prison custody
2021 deaths